A Quiet Place to Kill is a 1970 giallo film directed by Umberto Lenzi.

Plot
Helen, a racecar driver whose personal and professional life is rapidly declining, is invited by her ex-husband Maurice's new wife Constance to stay at their plush estate. The two women form a bond, and it is not long before their mutual dislike for the husband culminates into a plan to kill him. Their plot to murder Maurice on a sailing trip goes awry, and Constance accidentally gets killed instead. Helen and her ex seize the moment and dispose of Constance's corpse at sea, but when the dead woman's daughter Susan arrives, the young lady suspects that they have murdered her mother.

Cast 
 Carroll Baker as Helene
 Jean Sorel as Maurice Sauvage 
 Luis Dávila as Albert Duchamps 
 Alberto Dalbés as Dr. Harry Webb 
 Marina Coffa as Mrs. Susan
 Anna Proclemer as Constance Sauvage 
 Lisa Halvorsen as Solange
 Hugo Blanco
 Jacques Stany

Release
The film was released in Italy on February 20, 1970 under the title Paranoia.

The film was released internationally in 1973 as A Quiet Place to Kill, since Lenzi's previous 1969 film Orgasmo (1969) had already been released internationally as Paranoia. 
It was released in Spain as Una droga llamada Helen ( "A Drug Named Helen").

Reception
The Monthly Film Bulletin described the film as "both sluggish and scrappy, with Lenzi bravely throwing up a screen of object-fixated camerawork and fidgety focusing, but not receiving much help from his players".

References

Footnotes

Sources

External links
 

1970 films
1970 crime films
Giallo films
Films directed by Umberto Lenzi
Italian crime films
Spanish crime films
1970s Italian films